McKamey Manor is an American haunted house attraction in which survival horror-style events are enacted. McKamey Manor is considered a pioneer of "extreme" haunted attractions. It was founded in San Diego by Russ McKamey and originally located on his property. The house operates year-round, offering visitors a tour that can last up to eight hours. 

Guests must sign a liability waiver to participate. Items on the waiver include the inability to leave the experience without the staff's permission and being subjected to various forms of physical and psychological torture, including having bones broken, teeth removed without anesthesia, and being drugged.

McKamey Manor has attracted significant controversy, criticism, and media scrutiny.

Overview 
The house permits just a handful of patrons each weekend. There is no conventional entrance fee; McKamey instead accepts dog food for his pet dogs. At the Tennessee location, guests must be 21 or older, or 18–20 with parental consent. The Alabama location allows 21 or older.

The tour lasts from eight to ten hours, but no guest has made it all the way through. McKamey originally did not allow safewords for the tour, but has since reportedly allowed them, with guests having the option to use a safeword that ends the tour immediately. The house operates year-round, and there is reportedly a waiting list of over 24,000 people. The newest iteration of the tour, a ten-hour experience called Desolation, offers a prize of $20,000 for successful completion. McKamey deducts $500 from the prize for every failed challenge or the use of profanity.

During the tour, employees of the Manor may physically assault patrons, waterboard them, force them to eat and drink unknown substances, have them bound and gagged, and engage in other forms of physical and psychological torture. Journalist Tara West has mentioned that in the communities where the tour is stationed, residents question how the attraction stays legal, even with a waiver. Participants may also be drugged during their experience.

A volunteer guide testified that the 40-page waiver signed by participants lists possible risks which included having teeth extracted, being tattooed, and having fingernails removed.

Controversies 

According to participant Laura Hertz Brotherton, in a visit to the Manor in 2016, she repeated her safeword for several minutes before employees stopped torturing her. She later went to a hospital for extensive injuries.

According to an editorial by Jeff Heimbuch of HorrorBuzz, the haunt community does not consider McKamey Manor a part of traditional Halloween horror houses.

The McKamey Manor facility in Summertown, Tennessee has been the subject of many complaints in Lawrence County. County Commissioner Scott Franks described an incident in which deputies were called to the property after a neighbor saw a woman dragged screaming from a van as part of the experience, stating that, "Staged or not, this is simply something that none of us want anywhere near us." District Attorney Brent Cooper said the program was legal because people subjected themselves to it voluntarily, though participants could withdraw their consent at any time according to Tennessee law.

Media coverage
McKamey Manor was featured extensively in the 2017 documentary film Haunters: The Art of the Scare and on the Netflix original series Dark Tourist.

References

External links 
 

Haunted attractions (simulated)
Tourist attractions in Huntsville, Alabama
Tourist attractions in Lawrence County, Tennessee